Innsbruck Airport , also known locally as Kranebitten Airport, is the largest international airport in Tyrol in western Austria. The airport, which was opened in 1925, handles regional flights around the Alps, as well as seasonal international traffic to further European destinations. During the winter, activity increases significantly, due to the high number of skiers travelling to the region.

Facilities
The terminal has no airbridges; mobile stairways or the aircraft's own airstairs are used for boarding. The airport can handle aircraft up to the size of a Boeing 767. In February 2017, it was announced that the current passenger terminal, which was inaugurated for the 1964 Winter Olympics will be replaced with a new, larger facility that is planned to be constructed from 2019.

Innsbruck Airport is well known for having a difficult approach due to surrounding terrain, prohibiting certain aircraft types from operating at the airport. The approach and descent is a very complicated process—the Alps create vicious winds and currents, which pilots have to deal with throughout the process. It is a Category C airport, an airport with special difficulties requiring pilots to have special training before using it.
Approach or ascent over the eastern end of the runway goes over the inner city at fairly low altitude.

Innsbruck Airport served as the base of Tyrolean Airways and Welcome Air until their demise, although the newly established independent technical division Tyrolean Airways Luftfahrzeuge Technik GmbH remains here. Innsbruck also used to accommodate the head offices of Air Alps.

Airlines and destinations
The following airlines offer regular scheduled and charter flights at Innsbruck Airport:

Statistics

Ground transportation
The airport is connected to the city and to Innsbruck Hauptbahnhof by city bus F. The bus runs every 15 minutes and takes 18 minutes to reach the city.

See also
 Transport in Austria
 List of airports in Austria

References

External links

 Official website
 
 

Buildings and structures in Innsbruck
Airports in Austria
Transport in Innsbruck
Transport in Tyrol (state)
Airports established in 1925
1925 establishments in Austria
International airports in Austria
20th-century architecture in Austria